Samurai Shodown 64: Warriors Rage, known as  in Japan, is a 3D fighting game produced by SNK for its Hyper Neo Geo 64 system.  It is the follow-up to the original Samurai Shodown 64 on the same platform. A PlayStation game was released as part of the same series, and it used the Warriors Rage subtitle in America but dropped the 64 from the title. However, it is not the same as 64: Warriors Rage. Samurai Shodown! 2 on the Neo Geo Pocket Color is a 2D adaptation of this game, and a sequel to Samurai Shodown! on the Neo Geo Pocket which was a monochrome adaptation of Samurai Shodown IV.

Reception 
In Japan, Game Machine listed Samurai Shodown 64: Warriors Rage on their November 15, 1998 issue as being the second most-successful arcade game of the month.

References

External links

Samurai Spirits 2: Asura Zanmaden at NeoGeo Battle Coliseum Museum 

Added

1998 video games
Arcade video games
Arcade-only video games
Fighting games
3D fighting games
Hyper Neogeo 64 games
Samurai Shodown video games
SNK games
Cancelled 64DD games
Video games about samurai
Video game sequels
Video games developed in Japan